Kokkuthoduvai or Kokkuththoduvai (pronounced Kokkuth-thodu-vai) is a Town in the Mullaitivu District, Sri Lanka. Some say it translates to  'a-place-where-you-can-touch-the-Egret'.  It is located about 30 km South-east of the District capital Mullaitivu. It is a coastal town, located next to Kokkilai lagoon.

See also 

 Balasegaram Kandiah

Towns in Mullaitivu District
Maritimepattu DS Division